Community Service The Movie is a 2012 American slasher film written and directed by Joseph Patrick Kelly, and is his feature film directorial debut. The movie was released on July 21, 2012, and stars Chris Woods Marlins as a community service officer dealing with an escaped serial killer with post-traumatic stress disorder. The project was begun while the filmmaker was in college, and serves as a prequel to Bloody Island, which had a projected release date of 2016.

Synopsis
Years ago Billy Fouls (William Meyer) was teased and tormented to the point where he had to be committed to a psychiatric center. Now an adult, Billy decides to break out of the center after hearing that one of his bullies, Bob (Christopher Woods), is now a community service officer and will be holding a program at a campground located very near to his institution. Eager to exact his revenge, Billy escapes and begins to plan a series of bloody murders.

Cast
Christopher Woods as Officer Bob Butterfield
William Meyer as Billy Fouls
Joseph P. Kelly as Adam
Iliana Garcia as Danelia
Caitlin Kenyon as Kim
Hope Tomaselli as Paige
Renell Edwards as Smith
Marissa Mynter as Molly
Daniel Trinh as Dakota
Tristan MacAvery as Officer Jim Springfield

Recognition

Awards and nominations
 2012: won Best Grindhouse Film at Buffalo Niagara Film Festival
 2012: nominated for Best Feature at New Orleans Film Festival
 2013: won Excellence in the Art of Filmmaking at Palm Beach International Film Festival

References

External links

2012 films
2012 directorial debut films
2012 horror films
American slasher films
2010s slasher films
2010s English-language films
2010s American films